Yella may refer to:

 Yella (film), a 2007 German film directed by Christian Petzold, with Nina Hoss as the title character
 DJ Yella or Antoine Carraby (born 1967), an American DJ, music producer, and film director
 Yella Beezy (born c. 1990), American rapper
 Yella Pessl (1906–1991), Austrian-born American harpsichordist
 Yella Rottländer (born 1964), German actress and designer
 Yella Venkateswara Rao (born 1947), Indian musician

See also 
 Yela (disambiguation)
 Yeller (disambiguation)